Nobody Knows I'm Here is a 2020 Chilean drama film directed by Gaspar Antillo and starring Jorge Garcia, Millaray Lobos, Luis Gnecco, Alejandro Goic and Gastón Pauls. It is Netflix's first Chilean original movie.

Plot 

Memo Garrido lives with his uncle Braulio on a small verdant island in Llanquihue, a southeastern Chilean town. Despite living a peaceful life, Memo is haunted by traumatic childhood memories. He speaks very little, which sparks the interest of a local young woman named Marta. Over time, they become friends, and Memo reveals his biggest secret to her - that he was briefly famous as a singer. Throughout the film, we see Memo alone, dressed in a crimson glitter-studded cape, pretending to perform as if he were on stage. This fantasy reveals his desire to have made it as a famous singer.

As a child, Memo lived in Miami and his father, Jacinto, landed him a contract with a music producer. However, Jacinto decided that Memo's appearance was not enough to make him famous, so he made him a ghost singer for another young boy named Ángelo. Ángelo eventually became famous for the song "Nobody Knows I'm Here," which the studio had originally recorded for Memo. Angry at Ángelo for the "fraud," Memo attacked him after a performance, seriously injuring him and causing him to use a wheelchair. Memo became a recluse, living and working on his uncle's farm, while his father lost all his money promoting his son's ghost singer act.

Twenty-five years later, a candid YouTube video of Memo singing at his home, posted by Marta and a friend, leads to his father and Marta encouraging him to come out as the true singer. This lands Memo a spot on the television show "Face to Face" with Ángelo, who is now a motivational speaker promoting his book. During the reunion, Ángelo apologizes to Memo publicly, but never admits that Memo was the true singer. Memo leaves the stage angry, but after the show goes off air, he picks up the mic and sings the song live and beautifully, proving that he was the voice all along. However, it is unclear whether Memo's truth ever came to light since the performance was off-air, and the viewer even wonders if Memo truly sang the full song. Memo drops the microphone and exits the studio, doing a little dance move as he leaves.

Later, Marta crawls into bed with Memo, and the scene fades out to music with a fine crimson light on them as they warmly spoon together.

Cast

Release
Nobody Knows I'm Here was originally set to premiere at the Tribeca Film Festival, where Chilean director Gaspar Antillo won in the Best New Narrative Director category. However, the festival was postponed due to the COVID-19 pandemic. The film was released globally on Netflix on June 24, 2020.

Reception 
The film was positively received by critics, who have praised its earnestness and simplicity, Jorge García's performance, and its narrative structure.

References

External links
 
 

2020 films
2020 drama films
Spanish-language Netflix original films
Chilean drama films
Films about singers
2020s Chilean films